The 1986 NCAA Division II football season, part of college football in the United States organized by the National Collegiate Athletic Association at the Division II level, began in August 1986, and concluded with the NCAA Division II Football Championship on December 13, 1986, at Braly Municipal Stadium in Florence, Alabama, hosted by the University of North Alabama. The championship would remain hosted in Florence for the next twenty-eight seasons through 2013 before moving to Sporting Park in Kansas City, Kansas. The North Dakota State Bison defeated the South Dakota Coyotes, 27–7, to win their third Division II national title.

The first Harlon Hill Trophy, given to the best player in Division II, was awarded to Jeff Bentrim, quarterback for North Dakota State.

Conference changes and new programs
Indiana Central University changed its name to the University of Indianapolis.

Conference standings

Conference summaries

Postseason

The 1986 NCAA Division II Football Championship playoffs were the 14th single-elimination tournament to determine the national champion of men's NCAA Division II college football. The championship game was held at Braly Municipal Stadium in Florence, Alabama, for the first time.

Playoff bracket

See also
1986 NCAA Division I-A football season
1986 NCAA Division I-AA football season
1986 NCAA Division III football season
1986 NAIA Division I football season
1986 NAIA Division II football season

References